Ferdinand Berger is an Austrian publisher and printing company based in Horn, Lower Austria.

History

The publishing house and printing company was founded in 1868, initially limited to local newspapers and printing. From 1920, the publication list expanded into literature, history, fiction and poetry. Today, the publisher Ferdinand Berger publishes across Europe and employs about 250 people.

In addition to publishing various authors, the company is also publisher for the Austrian Federal Monuments Office, as the Austrian publisher of the encyclopedic manual of artistic monuments, the  first established by Georg Dehio.

Authors

Over the decades, the company have published numerous authors, including

    Vladimir Aichelburg (1945)
    Gerhard Blaboll (1958)
    Chaloupek Ferdinand (1900-1988)
    Joachim Dalfen (1936)
    Felix Ermacora (1923-1995)
    Rupert Feuchtmüller (1920-2010)
    Werner Gamerith (1939)
    Mario R. Lackner (1978)
    Gerhard Petermann (1942)
    Josef Pointner (1920)

Publications

The company publish books, e-books and several academic journals, both German and English language. The former include  (Communications of the Anthropological Society of Germany) and the latter include Phyton - Annales Rai Botanicae and Sydowia.

References

External links
 
 

Book publishing companies of Austria
Horn District